Patrea Smallacombe (born 13 October 1958, Adelaide, Australia) is a prolific Australian writer and series script editor who contributed to numerous soap operas in her native Australia including The Young Doctors, Prisoner, Neighbours and A Country Practice before moving to the United Kingdom in 1987.

In the United Kingdom she has written for many high-profile shows including Emmerdale, EastEnders, Brookside, Family Affairs, The Bill and also two separate stints penning scripts for the top rated ITV1 soap opera, Coronation Street.

In 1989 she was the script editor for Yorkshire Television's viewer controlled soap opera, Hollywood Sports.

Her aunt was the equally prolific Australian television series script writer, Betty Quin.

As of 2012, Smallacombe had joined the scriptwriting team of Hollyoaks.

References

External links

1961 births
Living people
20th-century Australian women writers
20th-century Australian writers
Australian soap opera writers
Australian women television writers
Australian women screenwriters
People from Adelaide
Women soap opera writers